The Wiki Wiki Shuttle is a free shuttle bus service at Daniel K. Inouye International Airport in Honolulu, Hawaii. Shuttles run between 6:00 am and 10:00 pm local time, carrying people and baggage between the various terminals.

In the Hawaiian language, the word  means quick. In 1994, the shuttle's name inspired American computer programmer Ward Cunningham to build the first ever user-editable website "WikiWikiWeb". Although WikiWikiWeb is itself no longer user-editable, the term wiki for a user-editable website thus derives from the shuttle's name.

Reduction of operations 

, the airport was moving away from dependence on the Wiki Wiki buses, which were put in place in 1970 as "an interim measure". Travelers had been complaining about the hot, slow, outdated buses. As was reported to the press, not only are the buses somewhat inconvenient and uncomfortable, they also put a huge strain on the building structure due to their weight and level of activity.

In November 2007, local media reported that the shuttle would be replaced by an air-conditioned walkway. The first phase of this change was completed in October 2009, giving international travelers the option of an air-conditioned hallway with a moving sidewalk instead of the open-air buses.

The buses were formerly run by the Aircraft Services International Group. In April 2009, the airport signed a new contract for the shuttle buses to be managed by Roberts Hawaii, and the signage on the shuttles was changed from "WikiWiki shuttle" to "HNL shuttle".

In 2013, the buses were still or again in active service in Honolulu Airport, but their usage was to be reduced for international arrivals as a result of the walkway that had been in use since the end of 2010. Despite this, new buses were added, and they were once more labelled "Wiki Wiki".

See also
 Chance RT-52, the bus originally used on the shuttle line
 TheBus, the public transportation service of Honolulu
 wikiwiki, the origin of wikiwiki web

References

External links

Correspondence on the Etymology of Wiki

Bus transportation in Hawaii
Daniel K. Inouye International Airport